Grigory Anatolyevich Kiriyenko (born 29 September 1965 in Novosibirsk) is a Russian fencer, who won two gold Olympic medals in the team sabre competition: at the 1992 Summer Olympics in Barcelona and at the 1996 Summer Olympics in Atlanta.

References

1965 births
Living people
Sportspeople from Novosibirsk
Soviet male fencers
Russian male fencers
Fencers at the 1992 Summer Olympics
Fencers at the 1996 Summer Olympics
Olympic fencers of the Unified Team
Olympic fencers of Russia
Olympic gold medalists for the Unified Team
Olympic gold medalists for Russia
Olympic medalists in fencing
Medalists at the 1992 Summer Olympics
Medalists at the 1996 Summer Olympics
Universiade medalists in fencing
Universiade gold medalists for the Soviet Union
Medalists at the 1991 Summer Universiade
Medalists at the 1993 Summer Universiade